The commune of Murwi is a commune of Cibitoke Province in north-western Burundi. The capital lies at Murwi.

References

Communes of Burundi
Cibitoke Province